Neopseustis sinensis is a species of moth belonging to the family Neopseustidae. It was described by D.R. Davis in 1975. It is known from the Sichuan Province in south-western China.

The wingspan is 23–24 mm.

References

Neopseustidae